Gurara is a Local Government Area in Niger State, Nigeria, adjoining the Federal Capital Territory. Its headquarters are in the town of Gawu.
Major inhabitants are the Gwari people. The Gurara Waterfalls is found here.

It has an area of 954 km and a population of 90,974 at the 2006 census.

The postal code of the area is 910.

References

Local Government Areas in Niger State